Luxury and specialty packaging is the design, research, development, and manufacturing of packaging, displays, and for luxury brands. The packaging of a luxury product is part of the brand’s image and research shows consumers are willing to spend more on products if the packaging looks appealing and luxurious.

As well as adding to the value of the product, luxury packaging fulfils various other roles; it enhances the image of the brand, increases consumer engagement through personalised packaging, performs a function, creates appeal and diversifies the product.

Globally, the luxury packaging market continues to grow, driven by global trends of personalised packaging, attention to sustainability issues, economic and demographic drivers. The luxury packaging market is forecast to grow by 4.4% to 2019, reaching $17.6 billion, and consumption will reach 9.9 billion tons with growth of 3.1%.

Package development considerations
Package design and development are often thought of as an integral part of the new product development process.  Alternatively, development of a package (or component) can be a separate process, but must be linked closely with the product to be packaged.

Package design starts with the identification of all the requirements: structural design, marketing, shelf life, quality assurance, logistics, legal, regulatory, graphic design, end-use, and environmental.   The design criteria, performance (specified by package testing),  completion time targets, resources, and cost constraints need to be established and agreed upon.  Package design processes often employ rapid prototyping, computer-aided design, computer-aided manufacturing  and document automation.

Security
High value products are inviting to theft.  Security packaging  can be an important consideration to help reduce package pilferage.  Authentication technologies can be used to help verify that the expensive luxury product is not among the many  counterfeit consumer goods.

Security solutions involve all phases of product production, packaging, distribution, logistics, sale, and use. No single solution is considered as "pilfer proof". Often, packaging engineers, logistics engineers, and security professionals have  addressed multiple levels of security  to reduce the risk of pilfering.

Each situation is unique.  Some considerations have included:
 Identifying who a potential thief might be: an internal employee, security guard, truck driver, delivery person, receiver (consignee), organized crime, etc. Engineers usually start with knowing what level of knowledge, materials, tools, etc. might they have.
 Identifying all feasible methods of unauthorized access into a product, package, or system. In addition to the primary means of entry, engineers also consider secondary or "back door" methods. 
 Identifying available means of resealing, reclosing, or replacing special seals. 
 Using extra strong and secure packaging: A weak or damaged package is an invitation to pilferage.
 Considering unique custom seals and labels (changing regularly because these are subject to counterfeiting)
 Improving the pilfer resistance to make pilfering more difficult, time-consuming, etc. 
 Concealing the identity and value of a pilfer able item during distribution.  Logistics and packaging professionals do not want bring attention to the item, its package, addresses, names, etc.
 Adding pilfer-evident features to help indicate the existence of pilfering. 
 Choosing a logistics provider who can reduce the risks of pilferage.
 Shipping in packages in unit loads with stretch wrap or in intermodal shipping containers with security seals
 Educating people to watch for evidence of pilfering.
 With a corrugated box, using a wider and stronger closure tape, 3-inch or 72 mm, reinforced gummed tape or pressure-sensitive tape.  
 Using a tamper-evident security tape or seal on packages that leaves a message,  warning, or other indication  if removed.
 Installing a surveillance system to help identify any suspects.

Design steps
Some designers consider nine steps to creating the graphic design of luxury packaging, beginning with meeting the client to gain insight into the product. The next step develops first sketches followed by developing the initial layout of the packaging. The fourth step involves refining the idea. The fifth step includes the lettering and typeface. The sixth step covers legalities and laws about how large the obligatory information must be printed, The seventh step involves final adjustments with the eighth step being choosing accents of the packaging. The final step involves designing matching accessories such as boxes or bags to complement the main packaging.

End-use products
 Cosmetics and fragrances
 Tobacco
 Confectionery
 Premium alcoholic drinks
 Gourmet food and drinks
 Watches and jewellery

See also
 Gourmet
 Luxury goods
 Designer label
 Veblen goods
 Wealth effect
 Superior goods

References

Books, general references
 Roessiger, Claude, "Unforgettable Packaging", Nevablu LLC, 2013, 
 Yam, K.L., "Encyclopedia of Packaging Technology", John Wiley & Sons, 2009,

Further reading
 Calver, G., What Is Packaging Design, Rotovision. 2004, .
 Leonard, E.A. (1996), Packaging, Marcel Dekker. .

Retail processes and techniques
Packaging
Retail packaging